Goga Union is a Union Parishad under Sharsha Upazila of Jessore District in the division of Khulna, Bangladesh. It has an area of 35.61 square kilometres and a population of 38,062. There are the name of the villages, Panchbhulat, Agrabhulat,  Horishchandrapur, Goga West, Goga East, Amlai,  Kaliani, Ichapur, Gopalpur, and Setai.

References

Unions of Sharsha Upazila
Unions of Jessore District
Unions of Khulna Division